Homatula pycnolepis is a species of stone loach endemic to the upper Mekong drainage in China.

References

Nemacheilidae
Fish of Asia
Freshwater fish of China
Taxa named by Hu Yu-Ting
Fish described in 2010